Blue Springs Lake is a  freshwater reservoir located near Blue Springs in Jackson County, Missouri.

The lake is located in the  Fleming Park, which is managed by Jackson County Parks and Recreation.

Recreational Activities 
Activities at the lake including power boating, water skiing, tubing and jet skiing. Common fish include bluegill, largemouth bass, hybrid striped bass, carp, and catfish.

Sources

External links

 Jackson County website

Reservoirs in Missouri
Buildings and structures in Jackson County, Missouri
Protected areas of Jackson County, Missouri
Kansas City metropolitan area
Bodies of water of Jackson County, Missouri